Kaliteyevo is a rural locality (a selo) in Rozhdestvenskoye Rural Settlement, Sobinsky District, Vladimir Oblast, Russia. The population was 39 as of 2010.

Geography 
Kaliteyevo is located 43 km north of Sobinka (the district's administrative centre) by road. Yeltesunovo is the nearest rural locality.

References 

Rural localities in Sobinsky District
Vladimirsky Uyezd